Eric Goulden (born 18 May 1954), known as Wreckless Eric, is an English rock/new wave singer-songwriter, best known for his 1977 single "Whole Wide World" on Stiff Records.  More than two decades after its release, the song was included in Mojo magazine's list of the best punk rock singles of all time. It was also acclaimed as one of the "top 40 singles of the alternative era 1975–2000".

Early life
Wreckless Eric was born in Newhaven, East Sussex. He is a cousin of actress Gemma Arterton through her mother. In 1973, he began attending Art School in Hull, where he joined bands such as Dirty Henry that played local clubs. On a break after his first year at school he saw Kilburn and the High Roads in Oldham. Struck by their honest approach to music, Eric decided to employ the same to his composing and performing. His next band, Addis and the Flip Tops, were the first incarnation of what would later be known as the DIY style. He first became known as one of the original members of the late 1970s Stiff Records artist roster, along with Ian Dury, Elvis Costello and Nick Lowe. Eric's first appearance on record was "Whole Wide World" on the Stiff label sampler A Bunch of Stiff Records in April 1977. The single version of that song was finally released in August. The song was produced by, and featured bass and guitar by Nick Lowe, with Steve Goulding on drums. The following month, the song was one of five tracks broadcast for the first of two sessions Eric recorded for DJ John Peel at BBC Radio 1. The song went on to make number 47 in John Peel's 'Festive Fifty', the so-called 'lost list' of 1977; it was number 8 in the Sounds critics' singles of the year; and it received an 'honourable mention' in the NME critics' chart. The song's reputation has grown over the years and numerous bands have covered "Whole Wide World", such as the Lightning Seeds, Mental As Anything, The Monkees (on their Pool It! album in 1987), The Proclaimers (on their 2007 album Life with You), Paul Westerberg, and Cage The Elephant (on their 2017 album Unpeeled).

His debut album Wreckless Eric was a Top 50 hit in the UK Albums Chart.  His second album with Stiff Records was The Wonderful World of Wreckless Eric.

End of Stiff days
Eric became increasingly unhappy with Stiff Records' business ideas and promotion. The label forced Eric to work with songwriting teams, hired backing bands and assigned his music to unsympathetic producers. By 1980, shortly after the release of Big Smash!, he decided to leave Stiff and record music at his home studio. Despite leaving the mainstream music business, he has continued writing songs and performing consistently throughout Europe and the United States. Since the 1980s Eric has released albums on numerous independent record labels.

Post-Stiff bands
Eric's post-Stiff bands/projects include: The Captains of Industry, The Len Bright Combo, The Hitsville House Band, with one album Karaoke (1997) recorded under his real name, Eric Goulden.

Post-Stiff albums

In 1985, he released A Roomful of Monkeys with the Captains of Industry. It was followed in 1986 by a couple of homemade garage albums with 'The Len Bright Combo'. He always stayed in touch with Ian Dury and the Blockheads – two Blockheads, Norman Watt-Roy and Mick Gallagher, were in the Captains of Industry.

In 1989, he signed to New Rose Records as Eric Goulden, released the homemade Le Beat Group Electrique with bassist André Barreau and drummer Catfish Truton. This same year he moved to France, in a quiet countryside corner where he stayed for about ten years. By the time he made this move to the vineyard country, he had already ended his "career of full-time alcoholic", that he referred to in his autobiography.

Eric toured Eastern Europe in a 1960s Peugeot car, both solo and with his band. In 1990, he released a second Le Beat Group Electrique album, recorded live in a New Rose record shop in Paris, entitled At the Shop with Eduardo Leal de la Gala and Fabrice Bertran on the drums. Together they formed the Hitsville House Band.

Eric returned to the UK in 1998, wrote his autobiography A Dysfunctional Success – The Wreckless Eric Manual about his life in England in the punk rock years and the music industry, ending at his departure for France. Eric contributed his version of "Clevor Trever" (sic) to the Ian Dury tribute album Brand New Boots and Panties released in 2001. A new album Bungalow Hi was home-recorded, produced and released in 2004.

Later career

The soundtrack to the 2002 film Heartlands contained  "(I'd Go The) Whole Wide World".

"(I'd Go The) Whole Wide World" appears in the 1996 film  Different for Girls.

In late 2005, Eric toured the UK (also playing Dublin) supporting fellow ex-Stiff artists The Damned.

In the 2006 film Stranger Than Fiction, starring Will Ferrell, Ferrell sings "Whole Wide World" while playing the guitar, until the original Wreckless Eric version takes over.

In 2008, Wreckless Eric & Amy Rigby was released. The album had a sound that was described as including "lots of strummed acoustic guitars, insistent and melodic bass lines and atmospherics created by vintage keyboards, synthesizers, processed electric guitars and electronic effects".  They toured to support the album.

Eric joined The Proclaimers onstage at Edinburgh Castle in Scotland, on 19 July 2008, to perform his song, "(I'd Go the) Whole Wide World" which they covered on their album Life with You. Eric and Amy Rigby joined John Wesley Harding onstage at Wiggins Park in Camden, New Jersey, United States, on 25 July 2009, to perform "(I'd Go the) Whole Wide World".

In September 2010, Eric and Rigby offered a track for a compilation album, Daddy Rockin Strong: A Tribute to Nolan Strong & The Diablos. They recorded a cover of the 1950s doo-wop song "I Want To Be Your Happiness." The Wind Records, along with Norton Records, released the album.

After some years living in France with his wife and co-performer, singer-songwriter Amy Rigby, Goulden moved with her to the United States in 2011.  As of November 2011, they lived in upstate New York, and continued to tour together.

In 2012, Wreckless Eric and Amy Rigby recorded a version of the Bread song "The Guitar Man", for the fund raising CD Super Hits of the Seventies, for the radio station WFMU.

In December 2013, Fire Records re-released both Len Bright Combo records and the band reunited for a one off show at The Lexington in London. In 2014, Fire Records re-released Le Beat Group Electrique, The Donovan of Trash and 12 O'Clock Stereo.

In December 2016, Wreckless Eric appeared in The Mighty Mighty Bosstones Hometown Throwdown at the House of Blues in Boston. He sang "(I'd Go The) Whole Wide World".

In April 2018, Wreckless Eric released an album of new songs, Construction Time & Demolition, supported with shows in the UK, the US, and Canada.

"(I'd Go The) Whole Wide World" appears in the eighth episode of the 2019 Amazon TV series The Widow.

Discography

Albums
As Wreckless Eric
 Wreckless Eric (March 1978: Stiff Records, SEEZ 6) No. 46 UK Albums Chart
 The Wonderful World of Wreckless Eric (October 1978: Stiff, SEEZ 9)
 Big Smash! (February 1980: Stiff, SEEZ 21) [double, inc. compilation album] No. 30 UK
 The Donovan of Trash (1991)
 Bungalow Hi (2004)
 AmERICa (2015)
 Construction Time & Demolition (2018)
 Transience (2019)

Compilations
 The Whole Wide World (December 1979) [compilation album] US release
 Almost a Jubilee: 25 Years at the BBC (with Gaps) (2003)
 Hits, Misses, Rags and Tatters (2010)With Captains of Industry
 Roomful of Monkeys (1984)With The Len Bright Combo
 The Len Bright Combo Presents... (1985)
 Combo Time (1986)
(The two Len Bright Combo albums were re-released on a single CD on Eric's Southern Domestic label in 2004).With Le Beat Group Electrique
 Le Beat Group Electrique (1989)
 At the Shop (1990)

With Hitsville House Band
 12 O'Clock Stereo  (1996)

As Eric Goulden
 Karaoke (1997)

With Amy Rigby

  Wreckless Eric & Amy Rigby (2008)
 Two-Way Family Favourites (2010)
 A Working Museum (2012)

Various artists compilation album appearances
 A Bunch of Stiff Records (1977)
Stiffs Live (1978: Stiff Records, GET 1) No. 28 UK Albums Chart
 Heroes & Cowards (1978)
 Can't Start Dancing (1978)
"Whole Wide World" featured on the That Summer! compilation album (June 1979) UK No. 36
 The Last Compilation Album (1980)
 The Stiff Records Box Set (1991)
 DiY 3: Teenage Kicks – UK Pop I (1976–79) (1993)
 Stranger Than Fiction Soundtrack (2006)
 The Sandinista! Project (2007)
"Sick Organism" featured on The Good Lyre - Songs of John Wesley Harding (2021)

Singles

See also
 List of new wave artists and bands
 List of Peel sessions
 Music of the United Kingdom (1970s)

Bibliography
 "Wreckless Eric" Goulden: A Dysfunctional Success – The Wreckless Eric Manual, Do Not Press (2004),

References

External links
Official website

Review of Len Bright Combo reunion show – Rockerzine.com 2013

1954 births
Living people
English male singers
English songwriters
English new wave musicians
People from Newhaven, East Sussex
The Minus 5 members
Stiff Records artists
People educated at Priory School, Lewes
British male songwriters